Bogislaw XIII (Bogusław XIII) of Pomerania (9 August 1544 – 7 March 1606, Stettin; Polish: Szczecin), son of Philip I and Maria of Saxony, was a prince of Stettin and Wolgast, and a member of the Griffins.

Bogislaw studied at the University of Greifswald at the age of 14. At first, he was co-regent with his brother Johann Friedrich of Pomerania-Wolgast, but in 1569 he settled with control over Barth and Neuenkamp. There, he founded a printing house in 1582, publishing in 1588 the "Barther Bible", a bible in the Low German language, as translated by Johannes Bugenhagen. In 1587 he founded Franzburg to compete with Stralsund.

From 1603 until his death, he ruled in Pomerania-Stettin, which he inherited under the Inheritance Treat of Jasenitz of 1509 in case his two brothers John Frederick (d. 1600) and Barnim X (d. 1603) would both die childless.  He kept his residence in Barth, and his eldest son, Philip II, acted as governor in Stettin.

He is remembered as a wise ruler, knowledgeable in the areas of economics and governance.

Marriages and issue 
He married twice: first to Clara of Brunswick-Lüneburg, daughter of Francis, Duke of Brunswick-Lüneburg. They had the following children:
 Philip II (1573 – 1618)
 Clara Maria (1574 –1623)
 Francis (1577 – 1620)
 Bogislaw XIV (1580 – 1637), the last ruling duke of Pomerania
 George II (1582 – 1617)
 Ulrich (1589 – 1622)
 Anna (1590 – 1660), married Ernst von Croÿ

Clara died in 1598. On 31 May 1601, he married Anna of Schleswig-Holstein-Sonderburg, daughter of John II, Duke of Schleswig-Holstein-Sonderburg. This marriage is childless.

Ancestors

See also
List of Pomeranian duchies and dukes
History of Pomerania
Duchy of Pomerania
House of Pomerania

Literature
Werner Buchholz (ed.): Deutsche Geschichte im Osten Europas. Pommern. Siedler Verlag, Berlin 1999, pp. 216, 233.
Martin Wehrmann: Geschichte von Pommern, 2d ed., vol. 2, Verlag Andreas Perthes, Gotha, 1921. Reprinted: Weltbild Verlag, Augsburg, 1992, .

External links 
 17th century sources, in German
 Family tree
 

1544 births
1606 deaths
Dukes of Pomerania
House of Griffins
16th-century German people